Jordan Andrew Espinosa (born November 8, 1989) is an American mixed martial artist competing in the flyweight division. He is most notable for his time in the Ultimate Fighting Championship.

Background
Espinosa wrestled with the West Mesa High School in New Mexico. He won the state championship as a sophomore, placed third as a junior and second in his senior year. At the national level, he was a five time Southwest Nationals Champion.

Espinosa attended the University of New Mexico where he received a bachelor's degree in Computer Engineering.

Mixed martial arts career

Amateur career
Epinosa made his amateur debut in June 2009, beginning his career as a flyweight. His third opponent was Ronnie White, whom he defeated by TKO due to punches. In his fifth amateur fight, he faced Joby Sanchez for the Que Loco CF Bantamweight title. Espinosa lost by submission in the third round. His sixth amateur fight would beagainst Jeremy Robledo. Espinosa won a unanimous decision. Espinosa achieved victory in his next three fights as well, with submission wins over Corey Cline and Noah Gagstatter, as well as a decision victory over Aaron Arvanitis. Espinosa finished his amateur career with a 8–1 record.

Early career
Espinosa made his professional debut in 2012 at Fostoria Fight Night, where he faced Joshua Killion. Espinosa won the fight by way of brabo choke.

Prior to appearing on Dana White's Contender Series, Espinosa had amassed a 10–5 record, finishing eight of his ten wins. During this time he won the TSE Bantamweight title, with a decision win over Brett Roller, and had spent the first part of his mixed martial arts career as a bantamweight, and fought two catchweight bouts.

Espinosa faced Nick Urso in a rematch on August 22, 2017 at Dana White's Contender Series 7 , after their first fight in the regional circuit ended in a no contest. He won the rematch by a technical submission via a d'arce choke. However, he was not awarded a UFC contract after this win.

Espinosa then faced C.J. Hamilton at an Alliance MMA event in March 2018 and won by split decision.

Returning to the Contender Series, he fought Riley Dutro during Dana White's Contender Series 12. Espinosa won the fight by TKO at the very end of the third round. Following the win, Espinosa was awarded a UFC contract.

Ultimate Fighting Championship
Espinosa was scheduled to make his UFC debut on November 10, 2018 at UFC Fight Night: The Korean Zombie vs. Rodríguez against Mark De La Rosa. However, prior to the fight, Epsinosa suffered a knee injury and was replaced by Joby Sanchez.

Espinosa subsequently made his debut on March 23, 2019 against Eric Shelton at UFC Fight Night: Thompson vs. Pettis. Espinosa won the fight by unanimous decision.

Espinosa's next faced Matt Schnell at UFC on ESPN: Covington vs. Lawler on August 3, 2019. He lost in the first round by triangle choke submission.

Espinosa next faced Alex Perez at UFC Fight Night: Blaydes vs. dos Santos on January 25, 2020. He lost the fight in the first round by technical submission due to an arm triangle choke.

Espinosa was scheduled to face Zhalgas Zhumagulov at a UFC in Kazakhstan on June 13, 2020. However, the event for Kazakhstan was later cancelled due to the COVID-19 pandemic and moved to a location in the United States.

Espinosa faced Mark De La Rosa at UFC on ESPN: Eye vs. Calvillo on June 13, 2020. He won the fight via unanimous decision.

Espinosa faced David Dvořák on September 19, 2020 at UFC Fight Night: Covington vs. Woodley. He lost the fight via unanimous decision.

Espinosa was expected to face Tim Elliott on January 16, 2021 at UFC on ABC 1.  However, Espinosa tested positive for COVID-19 in late December and the pairing was moved to UFC 259. Espinosa lost the fight via unanimous decision.

On March 11, 2021, it was announced that Espinosa was released from the UFC.

Mixed martial arts record
 

|-
|Loss
|align=center|15–10 (1)
|Jose Zarauz
|Submission (rear-naked choke)
|Combate Global - Reyes vs. Gomez
|
|align=center|2
|align=center|4:19
|Miami, Florida, United States
|-
|Loss
|align=center|15–9 (1)
|Tim Elliott
|Decision (unanimous)
|UFC 259
|
|align=center|3
|align=center|5:00
|Las Vegas, Nevada, United States
|
|-
|Loss
|align=center|15–8 (1)
|David Dvořák
|Decision (unanimous)
|UFC Fight Night: Covington vs. Woodley
|
|align=center|3
|align=center|5:00
|Las Vegas, Nevada, United States
|
|-
|Win
|align=center|15–7 (1)
|Mark De La Rosa
|Decision (unanimous)
|UFC on ESPN: Eye vs. Calvillo
|
|align=center|3
|align=center|5:00
|Las Vegas, Nevada, United States
|
|-
|Loss
|align=center|14–7 (1)
|Alex Perez
|Technical Submission (arm-triangle choke)
|UFC Fight Night: Blaydes vs. dos Santos
|
|align=center|1
|align=center|2:33
|Raleigh, North Carolina, United States
|
|-
|Loss
|align=center|14–6 (1)
|Matt Schnell
|Submission (triangle choke)
|UFC on ESPN: Covington vs. Lawler
|
|align=center|1
|align=center|1:23
|Newark, New Jersey, United States
|
|-
|Win
|align=center|14–5 (1)
|Eric Shelton
|Decision (unanimous)
|UFC Fight Night: Thompson vs. Pettis
|
|align=center|3
|align=center|5:00
|Nashville, Tennessee, United States
|
|-
|Win
|align=center|13–5 (1)
|Riley Dutro
|TKO (punches)
|Dana White's Contender Series 12
|
|align=center|3
|align=center|4:58
|Las Vegas, Nevada, United States
|
|-
|Win
|align=center|12–5 (1)
|C.J. Hamilton
|Decision (split)
|Alliance MMA at the Arnold Sports Festival
|
|align=center|3
|align=center|5:00
|Columbus, Ohio, United States
|
|-
|Win
|align=center|11–5 (1)
|Nick Urso
|Technical Submission (D'Arce choke)
|Dana White's Contender Series 7 
|
|align=center|1
|align=center|1:23
|Las Vegas, Nevada, United States
|
|-
|Win
|align=center|10–5 (1)
|Bobby Escalante
|Submission (brabo choke)
|Global Knockout 9
|
|align=center|1
|align=center|3:30
|Jackson, California, United States
|
|-
|Loss
|align=center|9–5 (1)
|Dinis Paiva
|Decision (unanimous)
|CES MMA 41 - Bessette vs. Croom
|
|align=center|3
|align=center|5:00
|Lincoln, Rhode Island, United States
|
|-
|Win
|align=center|9–4 (1)
|Brett Roller
|Decision (unanimous)
|TSE - Rocky Mountain Rubicon 3
|
|align=center|3
|align=center|5:00
|Fountain, Colorado, United States
|
|-
|Win
|align=center|8–4 (1)
|John Dirham
|TKO (punches)
|New League Fights - The Takeover
|
|align=center|2
|align=center|1:13
|Montpelier, Ohio, United States
|
|-
|NC
|align=center|7–4 (1)
|Nick Urso
|NC (illegal strikes)
|Jackson's MMA Series 17
|
|align=center|2
|align=center|2:50
|Santa Fe, New Mexico, United States
|
|-
|Win
|align=center|7–4
|Jordan Morales
|Submission (brabo choke)
|PA Cage Fight 20
|
|align=center|1
|align=center|1:35
|Wilkes Barre, Pennsylvania, United States
|
|-
|Win
|align=center|6–4
|Rafael de Freitas
|Decision (unanimous)
|Legacy Fighting Championship 36
|
|align=center|3
|align=center|5:00
|Allen, Texas, United States
|
|-
|Win
|align=center|5–4
|Jeremy Pender
|Decision (unanimous)
|Gladiators of the Cage: The Road to Glory 7
|
|align=center|3
|align=center|5:00
|Cleveland, Ohio, United States
|
|-
|Loss
|align=center|4–4
|Chris Dunn
|Decision (unanimous)
|Turf Wars 18
|
|align=center|3
|align=center|5:00
|Florence, Kentucky, United States
|
|-
|Win
|align=center|4–3
|Robert Browning
|Submission (choke)
|Bluegrass Brawl 12
|
|align=center|1
|align=center|2:29
|Lexington, Kentucky, United States
|
|-
|Loss
|align=center|3–3
|Rico DiSciullo
|Decision (unanimous)
|CES MMA 23
|
|align=center|3
|align=center|5:00
|Lincoln, Rhode Island, United States
|
|-
|Loss
|align=center|3–2
|Dominic Mazzotta
|Submission (rear-naked choke)
|Gladiators of the Cage: The North Shore's Rise to Power 3
|
|align=center|2
|align=center|2:57
|Pittsburgh, Pennsylvania, United States
|
|-
|Win
|align=center|3–1
|Tim Sosa
|Submission (brabo choke)
|XFC 25: Boiling Point
|
|align=center|1
|align=center|1:36
|Albuquerque, New Mexico, United States
|
|-
|Loss
|align=center|2–1
|Andrew Cseh
|Submission (rear-naked choke)
|Rocktagon MMA 26: Veni, Vidi, Vici
|
|align=center|1
|align=center|3:49
|Cleveland, Ohio, United States
|
|-
|Win
|align=center|2–0
|David Vigil
|Submission 
|Dollar D Promotions: Rattler Rumble
|
|align=center|1
|align=center|0:43
|La Junta, Colorado, United States
|
|-
|Win
|align=center|1–0
|Joshua Killion
|Submission (brabo choke)
|Golden Lotus Productions: Fostoria Fight Night
|
|align=center|1
|align=center|1:33
|Fostoria, Ohio, United States
|
|-
|}

Amateur mixed martial arts record

|-
|Win
|align=center| 5–1
|Noah Gagstatter 
|Submission (strikes) 
|Kentucky Fighting Challenge 07/30/11
|
|align=center|1
|align=center|2:10
|Ashland, Kentucky, United States
|
|-
|Win
|align=center| 4–1
|Aaron Arvanitis 
|Decision (unanimous)
|NAAFS Proving Ground Series 9 
|
|align=center|3
|align=center|3:30
|Streetsboro, Ohio, United States
|
|-
|Win
|align=center| 3–1
|Corey Cline 
|Submission (arm-triangle choke) 
|Boyz Gone Bad 3 
|
|align=center|1
|align=center|1:39
|Ashville, Ohio, United States
|
|-
|Win
|align=center| 2–1
|Jeremy Robledo 
|Decision (unanimous)
|Campus Cage Fights
|
|align=center|5
|align=center|3:00
|Alamosa, Colorado, United States
|
|-
|Loss
|align=center| 1–1
|Joby Sanchez
|Submission 
|Que Loco Cage Fighting - Unstoppable
|
|align=center|3
|align=center|?
|Albuquerque, New Mexico, United States
|
|-
|Win
|align=center| 1–0
|Ronnie White 
|TKO (punches)
|New Mexico Cage Fighting 4/17/10 
|
|align=center|1
|align=center|1:00
|Albuquerque, New Mexico, United States
|
|-
|}

See also
List of male mixed martial artists

References 

1989 births
American male mixed martial artists
People from Findlay, Ohio
Mixed martial artists from Ohio
Flyweight mixed martial artists
Mixed martial artists utilizing wrestling
Mixed martial artists from New Mexico
Sportspeople from Albuquerque, New Mexico
University of New Mexico alumni
Living people
Ultimate Fighting Championship male fighters